John "Jack" Flynn (birth unknown – death unknown) was an English professional rugby league footballer who played in the 1900s.

International honours
Jack Flynn won a cap for England while at Broughton Rangers in the 18-16 victory over New Zealand at Central Park, Wigan, on Saturday 11 January 1908, during the 1907–1908 New Zealand rugby tour of Australia and Great Britain.

References

Broughton Rangers players
England national rugby league team players
English rugby league players
Place of birth missing
Place of death missing
Rugby league halfbacks
Year of birth missing
Year of death missing